Shorehaven is a census-designated place (CDP) in the town of Pawling in Dutchess County, New York, United States. It was first listed as a CDP prior to the 2020 census.

Shorehaven is in southeastern Dutchess County, along the western edge of the town of Pawling. The CDP is bordered to the west by the town of Beekman. The community surrounds Whaley Lake, which drains north via Whaley Lake Stream to Fishkill Creek, a southwestward-flowing tributary of the Hudson River. New York State Route 292 runs through Shorehaven along the western side of Whaley Lake. The state highway leads north  to NY 55 in West Pawling and southeast  to Patterson.

Demographics

References 

Census-designated places in Dutchess County, New York
Census-designated places in New York (state)